A nerve conduction study (NCS) is a medical diagnostic test commonly used to evaluate the function, especially the ability of electrical conduction, of the motor and sensory nerves of the human body. These tests may be performed by medical specialists such as clinical neurophysiologists, physical therapists, chiropractors, physiatrists (physical medicine and rehabilitation physicians), and neurologists who subspecialize in electrodiagnostic medicine. In the United States, neurologists and physiatrists receive training in electrodiagnostic medicine (performing needle electromyography (EMG) and NCSs) as part of residency training and in some cases acquire additional expertise during a fellowship in clinical neurophysiology, electrodiagnostic medicine, or neuromuscular medicine. Outside the US, clinical neurophysiologists learn needle EMG and NCS testing.

Nerve conduction velocity (NCV) is a common measurement made during this test. The term NCV often is used to mean the actual test, but this may be misleading, since velocity is only one measurement in the test suite.

Medical uses 

Nerve conduction studies along with needle electromyography measure nerve and muscle function, and may be indicated when there is pain in the limbs, weakness from spinal nerve compression, or concern about some other neurologic injury or disorder. Spinal nerve injury does not cause neck, mid back pain or low back pain, and for this reason, evidence has not shown EMG or NCS to be helpful in diagnosing causes of axial lumbar pain, thoracic pain, or cervical spine pain.

Nerve conduction studies are used mainly for evaluation of paresthesias (numbness, tingling, burning) and/or weakness of the arms and legs. The type of study required is dependent in part by the symptoms presented. A physical exam and thorough history also help to direct the investigation. Some of the common disorders that can be diagnosed by nerve conduction studies are:
 Carpal tunnel syndrome
 Cubital Tunnel Syndrome
 Guillain–Barré syndrome
 Guyon's canal syndrome
 Peripheral neuropathy
 Peroneal neuropathy
 Spinal disc herniation
 Tarsal Tunnel Syndrome
 Ulnar neuropathy

Technique 

The nerve conduction study consists of the following components
 Motor NCS
 Sensory NCS
 F wave study
 H-reflex study

The nerve conduction study is often combined with needle electromyography.

Other 

The Department of Health and Human Services Inspector General recently identified the use of NCSs without a needle electromyography at the same time a sign of questionable billing.

Motor NCS 

Motor NCS are obtained by stimulating a nerve containing motor fibers and recording at the belly of a muscle innervated by that nerve. The compound muscle action potential (CMAP) is the resulting response, and depends on the motor axons transmitting the action potential, status of the neuromuscular junction, and muscle fibers. The CMAP amplitudes, motor onset latencies, and conduction velocities are routinely assessed and analyzed. As with sensory NCS, conduction velocity is calculated by dividing distance by time. In this case, however, the distance between two stimulation sites is divided by the difference in onset latencies of those two sites, providing the conduction velocity in the segment of nerve between the two stimulation sites. This method of calculating conduction velocity thereby avoids being confounded by time spent traversing the neuromuscular junction and triggering a muscle action potential (since these are subtracted out).

Sensory NCS 

Sensory NCS are performed by electrical stimulation of a peripheral nerve while recording the transmitted potential at a different site along the same nerve. Three main measures can be obtained: sensory nerve action potential (SNAP) amplitude, sensory latency, and conduction velocity. The SNAP amplitude (in microvolts) represents a measure of the number of axons conducting between the stimulation site and the recording site. Sensory latency (in milliseconds) is the time that it takes for the action potential to travel between the stimulation site and the recording site of the nerve. The conduction velocity is measured in meters per second and is obtained dividing the distance between stimulation site and the recording site by the latency: Conduction velocity = Distance/Latency

F-wave study 

F-wave study uses supramaximal stimulation of a motor nerve and recording of action potentials from a muscle supplied by the nerve. This is not a reflex, per se, in that the action potential travels from the site of the stimulating electrode in the limb to the spinal cord's ventral horn and back to the limb in the same nerve that was stimulated. The F-wave latency can be used to derive the conduction velocity of nerve between the limb and spine, whereas the motor and sensory nerve conduction studies evaluate conduction in the segment of the limb. F waves vary in latency and an abnormal variance is called "chrono dispersion". Conduction velocity is derived by measuring the limb length, D, in millimeters from the stimulation site to the corresponding spinal segment (C7 spinous process to wrist crease for median nerve). This is multiplied by 2 as it goes to the cord and returns to the muscle (2D). 2D is divided by the latency difference between mean F and M and 1 millisecond subtracted (F-M-1).

H-reflex study 
H-reflex study uses stimulation of a nerve and recording the reflex electrical discharge from a muscle in the limb. This also evaluates conduction between the limb and the spinal cord, but in this case, the afferent impulses (those going toward the spinal cord) are in sensory nerves while the efferent impulses (those coming from the spinal cord) are in motor nerves.
This process cannot be changed.

Specialized testing

Repetitive nerve stimulation

Interpretation of nerve conductions
The interpretation of nerve conduction studies is complex and requires the expertise of health care practitioners such as clinical neurophysiologists, medical neurologists, physical therapists, chiropractic neurologists or physiatrists. In general, different pathological processes result in changes in latencies, motor, and/or sensory amplitudes, or slowing of the conduction velocities to differing degrees. For example, slowing of the NCV usually indicates there is damage to the myelin. Another example, slowing across the wrist for the motor and sensory latencies of the median nerve indicates focal compression of the median nerve at the wrist, called carpal tunnel syndrome. On the other hand, slowing of all nerve conductions in more than one limb indicates generalized diseased nerves, or generalized peripheral neuropathy. People with diabetes mellitus often develop generalized peripheral neuropathy.

Patient risk
Nerve conduction studies are very helpful to diagnose certain diseases of the nerves of the body. The test is not invasive, but can be painful due to the electrical shocks and electrical burns. The shocks are associated with a low amount of electric current so they are not dangerous to anyone. Patients with a permanent pacemaker or other such implanted stimulators such as deep brain stimulators or spinal cord stimulators must tell the examiner prior to the study. This does not prevent the study, but special precautions are taken.

Cardiac pacemakers and implanted cardiac defibrillators (ICDs) are used increasingly in clinical practice, and no evidence exists indicating that performing routine electrodiagnostic studies on patients with these devices pose a safety hazard. However, there are theoretical concerns that electrical impulses of nerve conduction studies (NCS) could be erroneously sensed by devices and result in unintended inhibition or triggering of output or reprogramming of the device. In general, the closer the stimulation site is to the pacemaker and pacing leads, the greater the chance for inducing a voltage of sufficient amplitude to inhibit the pacemaker. Despite such concerns, no immediate or delayed adverse effects have been reported with routine NCS.

No known contraindications exist from performing needle EMG or NCS on pregnant patients. In addition, no complications from these procedures have been reported in the literature. Evoked potential testing, likewise, has not been reported to cause any problems when it is performed during pregnancy.

See also
 Bioelectronics
 Cable theory
 Biological neuron models

References

External links
 EMG & Nerve Conduction Education & Resources
 Association of EMG technologists of Canada
 American Association of Neuromuscular & Electrodiagnostic Medicine
 American Board of Electrodiagnostic Medicine
 Details of NCV from National Institutes of Health
 WebMD summary of EMG and NCS
 American Association of Sensory Electrodiagnostic Medicine

Electrodiagnosis
Neurophysiology
Neurology procedures

de:Nervenleitgeschwindigkeit#Messung